Dragan Drasković (born 1 September 1988) is a Montenegrin water polo player. He competed in the men's tournament at the 2012 Summer Olympics.

References

External links
 

1988 births
Living people
Montenegrin male water polo players
Olympic water polo players of Montenegro
Water polo players at the 2012 Summer Olympics
People from Kotor